Saadia Ashraf is an American football coach, and former quarterback of Team Canada and the Montreal Blitz. She has a Bachelor of Education degree in Physical Education from McGill University, and currently teaches at John Rennie High School (Quebec).

Playing career 
While she was in high school Ashraf’s parents did not permit her to play contact sports.  During this time she started playing touch football. In her early twenties she joined the Montreal Blitz as a quarterback, and in 2004 bought the team when the original owners wanted to sell. In 2010 she played in the first ever IFAF Women's Worlds in Sweden, winning a silver medal. In 2012 she won the Independent Women's Football League world championship with the Montreal Blitz. In 2013 she again quarterbacked Team Canada to a silver medal at the IFAF Women World's, this time in Finland.

Coaching career 
Ashraf has coached several different women's football teams. She is the quarterback coach for both Team Canada and the Montreal Blitz. She is also the head coach of the flag football team at John Abbott College.

References

External links 
 Montreal Blitz coaching staff page

Living people
McGill University alumni
Year of birth missing (living people)
Place of birth missing (living people)
American football quarterbacks
American football executives
Canadian players of American football
Female players of American football
Canadian sportswomen